Saltwater River is a rural locality in the local government area (LGA) of Tasman in the South-east LGA region of Tasmania. The 2016 census has a population of 123 for the state suburb of Saltwater River.

History 
Saltwater River was gazetted as a locality in 1967.

Saltwater River (also known as Saltwater Creek) is a former penal colony on the Tasman Peninsula in Tasmania, Australia.

The Saltwater River area contained two penal settlements. One was an agricultural settlement, which produced vegetables, wheat, and had a piggery. The other was a coal mine, known amongst convicts for its hellish conditions. It is now on the Australian National Heritage List as the Coal Mines Historic Site. Today, only ruins exist at the site, which include underground cells.

Saltwater River Post Office opened on 1 December 1878 and closed in 1970.

Geography
The waters of Norfolk Bay form the north-eastern boundary.

Road infrastructure 
Route C341 (Saltwater River Road) enters from the east and runs to the north, where it ends.

References

Australian penal colonies
Defunct prisons in Tasmania
Prison museums in Australia
Tourist attractions in Tasmania
Towns in Tasmania
Tasman Peninsula
Tasmanian Heritage Register
Convictism in Tasmania
Localities of Tasman Council